Nicolas Strange (born 26 March 1987) is a Welsh badminton player. He won five men's doubles title at the Welsh National Championships and three international title in Slovak, Iceland and Cyprus. Strange participated at the 2014 Commonwealth Games. He now works as head coach at the University of Warwick.

Achievements

BWF International Challenge/Series 
Men's doubles

  BWF International Challenge tournament
  BWF International Series tournament
  BWF Future Series tournament

References

External links 
 

1987 births
Living people
Sportspeople from Bangor, Gwynedd
Welsh male badminton players
Badminton players at the 2014 Commonwealth Games
Commonwealth Games competitors for Wales
Badminton coaches